The 1926 Pacific hurricane season ran through the summer and fall of 1926. Before the satellite age started in the 1960s, data on east Pacific hurricanes was extremely unreliable. Most east Pacific storms were of no threat to land.

Systems

Tropical Storm One
A tropical storm existed in the Gulf of Tehuantepec on June 13.

Hurricane Two
Well south of Mexico, a tropical cyclone formed on July 5. It moved northwestward, and was last observed on July 9 while located south of the southern tip of the Baja California Peninsula.

Tropical Cyclone Three
Far from land, a tropical cyclone was reported on July 21.

Tropical Cyclone Four
On August 8, a tropical cyclone began forming. It was definitely extant on August 11, and was last seen on August 15.

Tropical Cyclone Five
Another tropical cyclone was observed from August 22 to 23.

Tropical Cyclone Six
A tropical cyclone existed from September 14 to 16, during which time it moved along the coast. It caused heavy rain.

Tropical Cyclone Seven
A tropical cyclone moved along the coast from Manzanillo, to Mazatlán, to the southern tip of the Baja California Peninsula, from September 24 to 26.

Tropical Storm Eight
A tropical cyclone formed south of Acapulco on October 2. The next day, it was a tropical storm. It pretty much hung around in the same area, and dissipated near the western Gulf of Tehuantepec on October 11.

See also

1926 Atlantic hurricane season
1926 Pacific typhoon season
1920s North Indian Ocean cyclone seasons
 1900–1940 South Pacific cyclone seasons
 1900–1950 South-West Indian Ocean cyclone seasons
 1920s Australian region cyclone seasons

References

1920s Pacific hurricane seasons
Pacific hurricane seasons